Black One may refer to:

 Kali or Kālikā, a Hindu goddess
 Black One (album), by Sunn O))), 2005
 The Black Ones, a predecessor of South African male choral group Ladysmith Black Mambazo
 Black One, a character in Italian science fiction action film 2020 Texas Gladiators

See also
Aphrodite, an ancient Greek goddess, one epithet for whom was Melainis ('Black One')
Bugg-Shash, or the Black One, a Cthulhu Mythos deity
Chort, an anthropomorphic demon of total evil of doom
Črnec (creek) ('the black one') a stream in Slovenia
Dampa Sangye (died 1117), descriptive name Nakpopa ('Black One'), a Buddhist mahasiddha
de Zwart, a Dutch surname, meaning "the black (one)"
ES Sétif, nicknamed El Kahla ('the Black One'), an Algerian football club
Mercedes Sosa (1935–2009), sometimes known as La Negra ('the Black One'), an Argentine singer 
One kreuzer black, or Schwarzer Einser ('Black One'), the first postage stamp in the Kingdom of Bavaria
"The Pool of the Black One" a fantasy short story by Robert E. Howard
Ulf Kirsten (born 4 December 1965), German footballer and manager, nicknamed Der Schwatte ('the Black One')